James Michael  Hold Jr. (born March 16, 1963) is a former American football quarterback in the National Football League and Arena Football League. He played for the Chicago Bruisers, Tampa Bay Buccaneers, Maryland Commandos, Denver Dynamite, Sacramento Attack, Orlando Predators, Connecticut Coyotes, Arizona Rattlers and Houston ThunderBears. He later was the head coach of the Augusta Stallions, Carolina Cobras, Las Vegas Gladiators and Mahoning Valley Thunder. He played college football at Mesa Community College prior to transferring to South Carolina.

Hold made a cameo appearance in the 1998 sports comedy film The Waterboy, where he plays a quarterback for the Central Kentucky Football team. 

Hold is currently the Executive Athletic Director of Newberry College.

References

1963 births
Living people
Players of American football from Phoenix, Arizona
American football quarterbacks
South Carolina Gamecocks football players
Chicago Bruisers players
Tampa Bay Buccaneers players
Maryland Commandos players
Denver Dynamite (arena football) players
Sacramento Attack players
Orlando Predators players
Connecticut Coyotes players
Arizona Rattlers players
Houston ThunderBears players
Mesa Thunderbirds football players
Carolina Cobras coaches
Augusta Stallions coaches
Macon Knights coaches
National Football League replacement players